The 33rd annual Japanese Regional Football League Competition took place from 21 November 2009 to 6 December 2009. It took place across the prefectures of Fukushima, Toyama, Tottori, Kōchi and Nagano. It is the tournament which decided promotion to the Japan Football League for the 2010 season. The top two teams in this competition (Matsumoto Yamaga and Hitachi Tochigi Soccer Club) were given promotion to the Japan Football League. Third place Zweigen Kanazawa achieved promotion via a two-leg play off with F.C. Kariya.

Tournament outline

Preliminary round - Four groups of four teams play each other once in a round-robin tournament. The top placed team in each group advances to the final round.
Final Round - The four winners from the preliminary round play each other once in a round-robin tournament.

Three points are awarded for a win in standard time and zero for a lose. If at the end of standard time the result is a tie, a penalty shoot-out is held; the winning team is awarded 2 points and the losing team 1.

If the number of points are the same, the league position is ordered by goal difference, then the number of goals scored, and finally the result between the respective teams. If the 1st-place position cannot be decided by these factors, a play off will be contested between top two teams.

Venues 
Preliminary round
Group A - Iwaki Greenfield, Iwaki, Fukushima prefecture
Group B - Takaoka Sports Core, Takaoka, Toyama prefecture
Group C - Tottori Athletics Stadium, Tottori, Tottori prefecture
Group D - Kochi Haruno Athletic Stadium, Kōchi, Kōchi Prefecture

Final round
Matsumotodaira Football Stadium, Matsumoto, Nagano prefecture

Participating teams

9 Regional League champions
Hokkaido: Satsudai Goal Plunderers
Tohoku: Grulla Morioka
Kanto: Yokohama Sports and Culture Club
Hokushinetsu: College of Upward Players in Soccer
Tokai: Yazaki Valente
Kansai: Sanyo Denki Sumoto Football Club
Chugoku: Renofa Yamaguchi
Shikoku: Tokushima Vortis Second
Kyushu: Okinawa Kariyushi

Runner-Up from selected leagues
Regional Leagues whose representative reached the final round in 2008, are eligible for a second team to represent them.
Kanto: Hitachi Tochigi Soccer Club
Chugoku: NTN Okayama S.C.
Kyushu: Volca Kagoshima

High performing teams in the All Japan Senior Football Championship
Matsumoto Yamaga (Hokushinetsu) (winner)
Zweigen Kanazawa (Hokushinetsu) (runner-up)

Invited teams
 AS Laranja Kyoto (Kansai)
 Hamamatsu University (Tokai)

Results

Preliminary round

Group A

Group B

Group C

Group D

Final Round

References
 Japan Football Association - The 33rd National Regional Football League Competition - Final Round 
 Japan Football Association - The 33rd National Regional Football League Competition - Schedule and Results 
 Japan Football Association - The 33rd National Regional Football League Competition - Tournament Outline 
 The Rec.Sport.Soccer Statistics Foundation - Japan Fourth and Lower Levels 2009

2009
play